Punken is the debut studio album by American rapper Maxo Kream, released on January 12, 2018, by TSO Music Group and Kream Clicc. The album was produced by Sonny Digital, Beat Boy, Wlderness and rapper $crim of Suicideboys, among others. It also features guest appearances from Trippie Redd, D. Flowers and 03 Greedo.

Punken was supported by three singles – "Grannies", "5200" and "Bussdown".

Background
On January 3, 2018, Maxo Kream unveiled the album's cover art, tracklist and release date, alongside its pre-order.

Promotion

Tour
On February 7, 2018, Maxo Kream announced an official headlining concert tour to further promote the album titled Punken Tour. The tour began on March 21, 2018, in San Francisco, at Brick & Mortar. He will be supported by Cuz Lightyear.

Critical reception

Sheldon Pearce of Pitchfork stated that "the Houston rapper's first mixtape since 2016 is full of unsparing storytelling, pusher anthems, and a dynamic array of trap production over which Maxo delivers some of his most effective writing", praising the album's lyricism: "Maxo has always been an impressive rapper and an imposing force, maximizing his thunderous voice, but Punken has his most effective writing, his most complete performances, his most engrossing setups, and his most enduring images."

Track listing

References

External links
 Punken on Soundcloud

2018 debut albums
Albums produced by Sonny Digital
Albums produced by Honorable C.N.O.T.E.